Sasha Masakowski (born 1986) is an American jazz singer. She was born in New Orleans and is the daughter of jazz guitarist Steve Masakowski.

Awards and honors
 Nominated Best Female Vocalist and Best Emerging Artist, Offbeat magazine, 2009

Discography 
 Wishes (Hypersoul, 2011)
 Old Green River (2015)
 Hildegard with Hildegard (2015)
 N.O. Escape with Masakowski Family (2016)
 Art Market (Ropeadope, 2018)

As guest
 Irvin Mayfield, New Orleans Jazz Playhouse (Basin Street, 2015)
 Now vs. Now, The Buffering Cocoon (Jazzland, 2018)

References

External links
 

1986 births
Living people
Musicians from New Orleans
American women jazz singers
American jazz singers
21st-century American musicians
21st-century American women